KF Liria Milloshevë is a professional football club from Kosovo which competes in the Third League (Group B). The club is based in Milloshevë, Obiliq. Their home ground is the Milloshevë Sports Field which has a viewing capacity of 500.

See also
 List of football clubs in Kosovo

References

Football clubs in Kosovo
Association football clubs established in 1999
1999 establishments in Kosovo